George Galbraith was Dean of Derry from 1901 until his death in 1911.

Born in 1829, he was educated at Portora Royal School and Trinity College, Dublin. He was ordained in 1852 and began his ecclesiastical career with a curacy at  Kilglass. He was Rector of Lower Cumber from  1867 until his elevation to the Deanery.

He died on 3 October 1911.

References

Irish Anglicans
Deans of Derry
1829 births
1911 deaths
People educated at Portora Royal School
Alumni of Trinity College Dublin